A shoot in professional wrestling is any unplanned, unscripted, or real-life occurrence within a wrestling event. It is a carny term shortened from "straight shooting", which originally referred to a gun in a carnival target shooting game that did not have its sights misaligned.  Terminology such as this reflects the professional wrestling industry's roots in traveling carnivals. 

The term has come to mean a legit attack or fight in professional wrestling, and its meaning has broadened to include unscripted events in general. The opposite of a shoot is a work or kayfabe. 'Shoot' may also refer to legitimate 'shooting' for a takedown, as in interscholastic, amateur, and Olympic wrestling. With professional wrestling's history of 'shooters' and 'hookers', wrestlers with elite grappling skills, and the recent rise of shoot style wrestling and mixed martial arts, this use of the term is growing.

Occurrences
Professional wrestling is staged entertainment rather than a sports competition. As such, virtually everything in it is worked (part of the show), and shoots rarely occur. Shoots in general are against the nature of the business, similar to an actor ad-libbing or dropping character during a performance. Performers who shoot during a wrestling event are often punished (often by lower pay or relegation to opening bouts) or even fired, since they cannot be relied on to act according to the bookers' wishes. Shoots can also occur when wrestlers stop cooperating in a match. This may occur to teach one of the wrestlers "a lesson" for whatever reason, or if a wrestler has an issue with the promoter and intentionally makes the match look bad.

Fan interference
While the term technically applies only to wrestling performers, crowds also cause shoots by interfering in events, usually by assaulting or attempting to assault a wrestler. Fan interference and violence was prevalent in the northeastern and southern United States from the mid to late 20th century, where many wrestling territories became known for offering violent action to a rabid, fiercely loyal audience which largely believed in what it was seeing.

In 1988, during a steel cage match between "Macho Man" Randy Savage and "The Million Dollar Man" Ted DiBiase at New York City's Madison Square Garden, a fan jumped the guardrail during a tense moment in the match. DiBiase, recalling the incident in his autobiography, yelled for Virgil (DiBiase's bodyguard, who was attempting to interfere in the match) to knock the man down, which he did, before security led the suspect away as the match played out as intended (Savage knocking the heads of DiBiase and Virgil together before escaping the cage).

In 2002, during a ladder match between Eddie Guerrero and Rob Van Dam, a fan jumped the guardrail, got into the ring, and knocked over the ladder while Guerrero was climbing it. Guerrero noticed what was going on, landed on his feet, and kicked the fan a few times before security took him away.

During a match with Bray Wyatt at a WWE house show in Victoria, British Columbia in August 2015, Roman Reigns was struck in the head by a metal replica Money in the Bank briefcase thrown by a fan. Reigns was momentarily dazed by the incident, but was able to continue the match.

Worked shoots
Worked shoot is the term for any occurrence that is scripted by the creative team to come off as unscripted and therefore appear as though it were a real-life happening but is, in fact, still part of the show. This can be seen as an example of the writers breaking the fourth wall and attempting to court the fans who are interested in shoots (i.e., events outside the traditional in-ring wrestling matchups). Notable characteristics of a worked-shoot include the mentioning of terms and information generally known only to industry insiders and "smart" fans. This community of "smart" pro-wrestling fans are sometimes referred to as "smarks".

A major example of a worked shoot occurred on June 27, 2011 episode of Raw, where CM Punk delivered a promo popularly known as a "pipebomb" promo. In it, Punk aired his grievances with WWE at the time and announced he would leave the promotion three weeks after his promo with the WWE Championship (Punk would sign a new contract during the time period); the promo was not cut off until Punk attempted to mention bullying issues within the company. In order to provide an air of legitimacy, Punk received a kayfabe suspension from the company following the promo.

Shoot interview
A "shoot interview" is generally conducted and released by someone other than a wrestling promotion. They are conducted out of character with a wrestler, promoter, manager, or other insider generally being interviewed about their career and asked to give their opinion on wrestlers, promotions, or specific events in their past. While some wrestlers used these as an opportunity to insult people or promotions they dislike, many are more pleasant. These shoots are often released on DVD, end up on YouTube or other video sharing websites, or as a part of a wrestling podcast.

While shoot interviews generally occur outside a show, one rare example of a shoot interview during a televised show occurred on October 23, 1999, when Doug Gilbert, then with the Memphis independent promotion Power Pro Wrestling, turned a televised interview intended to further a feud with Brian Christopher into a shoot that soon led to the demise of the promotion. Gilbert publicly exposed the fact that Jerry Lawler, previously the owner of the USWA, another significant Memphis-based promotion, was Brian's father—a blatant violation of kayfabe, the portrayal of events within professional wrestling as not being staged (in this case, Brian "not" being Jerry's son). He also made disparaging remarks about both Lawlers, as well as the promotion's booker Randy Hales.

Shoot fighting
Drawing from this related term, a shooter or shoot-fighter is not a wrestler with a reputation for being uncooperative but one who uses legit hooking skills in their repertoire. These wrestlers often gain their skills from martial arts (Ken Shamrock or Josh Barnett), catch wrestling (Lou Thesz or Billy Robinson) or amateur wrestling (Kurt Angle or Brock Lesnar). These kinds of shooters are sometimes referred to as stretchers (from their ability to use legit holds on their opponents to stretch them).

Despite the worked nature of the spectacle, shooters have been around since the beginning.  Originally, the National Wrestling Alliance's World Champion was typically a shooter or "hooker" in an effort to keep regional champions and other contenders from attempting to shoot on them and win the title when they were not scheduled to do so.

The use of the term "shoot" to describe a single or double-leg takedown attempt (in legit fighting situations such as mixed martial arts) is inspired by early professional wrestling shooters, who would often utilize these basic wrestling moves when shooting on an opponent (as opposed to the flashier takedowns used in worked matches, such as suplexes).

An example of shoot fighting happened on the November 4, 2004, episode of SmackDown!, taped in St. Louis, Missouri. During an unscripted segment of Tough Enough, Kurt Angle, a former American amateur wrestler and 1996 Olympic gold medalist, challenged the finalists to a squat thrust competition. Chris Nawrocki won the competition, and the prize Nawrocki won was a match against Angle. Angle quickly took Nawrocki down with a guillotine choke, but Nawrocki managed to make it to the ropes, forcing Angle to break the hold. Angle then took Nawrocki down with a double leg takedown, breaking his ribs. Angle locked another guillotine choke on Nawrocki, pinning him in the process. After Angle defeated Nawrocki, Angle challenged the other finalists. Daniel Puder, an American professional mixed martial artist, accepted Angle's challenge. Angle and Puder wrestled for position, with Angle taking Puder down; however, in the process, Puder locked Angle in a kimura lock. With Puder on his back and Angle's arm locked in the kimura, Angle pushed Puder's shoulders down, pinning him. One of the two referees in the ring, Jim Korderas, quickly counted three to end the bout, despite the fact that Puder's shoulders were not fully down on the mat, bridging up at two. Puder later claimed he would have snapped Angle's arm on national television if Korderas had not ended the match. Dave Meltzer and Dave Scherer gave these following comments:

The term is also often used by wrestling fans, in another definition (in this case, also known as shoot wrestling) to refer to mixed martial arts competitions, which, while superficially similar to wrestling matches, are actual athletic competition rather than sports entertainment.

Other shoots
Example of spontaneous events that are not shoots include mistakes by wrestlers (these are known as botches) or matches where the wrestlers are good enough to not need to plan and rehearse beforehand. In such matches the wrestlers go into the match with only the length of the match and what the result should be, and work with each other off instinct and experience, often by "calling spots" in a voice low enough the crowd cannot hear until they reach the finish. The job of the referee will usually involve reminding them of time limits and often calling for the match to "go home" to the intended ending. Another way a referee may be involved is if there is an injury, or one of the wrestlers fails to respond to a 10 count or a pin. In some promotions referees are instructed to adjudicate regardless of the intended finish, resulting in a shoot ending with an "incorrect" winner, or one where the match finish is different.

Shoots may also involve those outside the wrestling business. In 1984, while filming a 20/20 segment on professional wrestling, reporter John Stossel remarked to wrestler David "Dr. D" Schultz that wrestling was fake. Yelling "You think this is fake?", Schultz slapped him and knocked him to the ground twice. Stossel claimed that he still suffered from pain and buzzing in his ears eight weeks after the assault. Schultz maintains that he attacked Stossel because WWF owner Vince McMahon wanted him to.

See also
Shoot wrestling
Glossary of professional wrestling terms
Breaking the fourth wall
Breaking character

References

Further reading

Professional wrestling slang